Miss USA 1969 was the 18th Miss USA pageant, televised live by CBS from Miami Beach, Florida on May 24, 1969.

The pageant was won by Wendy Dascomb of Virginia, who was crowned by outgoing titleholder Dorothy Anstett of Washington.  Dascomb was the first woman from Virginia to win the Miss USA title, and went on to place as a semi-finalist at Miss Universe 1969.

Results

Special awards

Historical significance 
 Virginia wins competition for the first time and surpasses its previous highest placement in 1954. Also becoming in the 16th state who does it for the first time.
 Vermont earns the 1st runner-up position for the first time and reaches the highest placement since Carlene King Johnson won in 1955.
 South Carolina earns the 2nd runner-up position for the first time.
 Arizona earns the 3rd runner-up position for the first time.
 California earns the 4th runner-up position for the second time. The last time it placed this was in 1963.
 States that placed in semifinals the previous year were Alabama, California, Connecticut, Hawaii, Nevada, New Mexico, New York, Virginia and Washington.
 California placed for the thirteenth consecutive year.
 Alabama, Nevada and Virginia placed for the third consecutive year. 
 Connecticut, Hawaii, New Mexico, New York and Washington made their second consecutive placement.
 Arizona, Florida and Texas last placed in 1967.
 South Carolina last placed in 1965.
 Colorado last placed in 1963.
 Vermont last placed in 1955.
 Maryland and Tennessee break an ongoing streak of placements since 1966.

Delegates
The Miss USA 1969 delegates were:

 Alabama - Hitsy Parnell
 Alaska - Linda Rowley
 Arizona - Ruth Hayes
 Arkansas - Leonette Reed
 California - Troas Hayes
 Colorado - Susan Hawkins
 Connecticut - Elizabeth Wanderman
 Delaware - Marsha Stoppel
 District of Columbia - Shelley Gosman
 Florida - Maria Junquera
 Georgia - Judy Lyons
 Hawaii - Stephanie Quintana
 Idaho - Karen Tall
 Illinois - Christine Jalloway
 Indiana - Linda Smith
 Iowa - Becky Stoner
 Kansas - Mary McGugin
 Kentucky - Regina Pryor
 Louisiana - Patricia Dupre
 Maine - Elaine Bolduc
 Maryland - Ardis Fowler
 Massachusetts - Martha Cawley
 Michigan - Lisa Brenner
 Minnesota - Laureen Darling
 Mississippi - Rose Marie Ray
 Missouri - Cherrie Hofmann
 Montana - Christina Jovin
 Nebraska - Marily Poole
 Nevada - Karen Esslinger
 New Hampshire - Dorothy Conners
 New Jersey - Nancy Fromel
 New Mexico - Mary Gard
 New York - Rosemary Hradek
 North Carolina - Faye Bass
 North Dakota - Beckee Benz
 Ohio - Marlynn Singleton
 Oklahoma - Deborah Federson
 Oregon - Karen Morton
 Pennsylvania - Marlene Vaughn
 Rhode Island - Donna Lewis
 South Carolina - Eva Engle
 South Dakota - Mary Bergren
 Tennessee - Suzie Richardson
 Texas - Sande Drews
 Utah - Anne Mueller
 Vermont - Mary Verdiana
 Virginia - Wendy Dascomb
 Washington - Deborah Giberson
 West Virginia - Betty Grimmer
 Wisconsin - Christine Sachen
 Wyoming - Pam Lewis

External links 
 

1969
1969 in the United States
1969 beauty pageants
1969 in Florida